Diego Manuel Rodríguez da Luz (born 8 August 1986 in Montevideo) is a Uruguayan footballer.

Career
In 2008, he was transferred to Bologna to play in the Italian Serie A where he didn't play much. Then we went to Argentina to play for Huracán a well-known team in that country.

External links
 Profile at tenfieldigital.com.uy
 Primera División statistic
 

Footballers from Montevideo
Living people
1986 births
Uruguayan footballers
Uruguayan expatriate footballers
Association football midfielders
Peñarol players
Bologna F.C. 1909 players
Club Atlético Huracán footballers
Defensor Sporting players
Club Atlético River Plate (Montevideo) players
Juventud de Las Piedras players
Atenas de San Carlos players
Uruguayan Primera División players
Argentine Primera División players
Serie A players
Uruguayan expatriate sportspeople in Italy
Uruguayan expatriate sportspeople in Argentina
Expatriate footballers in Italy
Expatriate footballers in Argentina